Blue Mountain is a peak of the Kittatinny Mountains in Sussex County, New Jersey, United States. It lies along the Appalachian Trail in Stokes State Forest, 4 miles west of the U.S. Route 206 crossing, and overlooks Quick's Pond to the south, and Mecca Lake to the southeast.

History
Blue Mountain was formerly the name for the entire Kittatinny Mountains. In New Jersey it is now generally restricted to this peak alone, however the Pennsylvania portion of the range is still known as Blue Mountain. The Lawrence Line, dividing East Jersey and West Jersey, crosses the mountain at this point.

References

External links
Stokes State Forest

Mountains of New Jersey
Kittatinny Mountains
Mountains of Sussex County, New Jersey